Cristhian Pacheco Mendoza (born 26 May 1993) is a Peruvian long distance runner who specialises in the marathon.

Running career 
Pacheco competed in the men's marathon at the 2016 and 2020 Summer Olympics.

He won the Marathon at the 2019 Pan American Games which was held in Lima, Peru. This race set a new Pan American Games record with a time of 2:09.31. It was also the Peruvian national record. 

On February 19th, 2023 he placed 11th in the Valencia Marathon in a time 2:07:38 breaking his own personal best, and the national record, by nearly 2 minutes.

Statistics 
Information from World Athletics profile.

Personal bests

International Competition Results

Personal Life 
He is a younger brother of Raúl Pacheco, also a marathoner.

References

External links
 

1993 births
Living people
Peruvian male long-distance runners
Peruvian male marathon runners
Athletes (track and field) at the 2016 Summer Olympics
Olympic athletes of Peru
Athletes (track and field) at the 2019 Pan American Games
Pan American Games gold medalists for Peru
Pan American Games medalists in athletics (track and field)
Pan American Games gold medalists in athletics (track and field)
Medalists at the 2019 Pan American Games
People from Huancayo
Athletes (track and field) at the 2020 Summer Olympics
21st-century Peruvian people